The Banū Aws (  , "Sons of Aws") or simply Aws (also romanised as Aus) was one of the main Arab tribes of Medina. The other was Khazraj, and the two, constituted the Ansar ("helpers [of Muhammad]") after the Hijra.

The Aws tribe descend from the ancient tribe al-Azd, a branch of the Qahtanite Arabs Aws and Khazraj were known as Banū Qayla (  ) in pre-Islamic era.

Etymology
The word al-Aws means "the gift", probably a contraction for Aws Manāt ("the gift of Manāt"). The name was changed in Islamic times to Aws Allāh.

Early history
About AD 300 during the emigration of Kahlān from Yemen prior to the Great Flood of Mar'ib Dam, Thaʻlaba bin ʻAmr, grand father of al-Aws, separated from his tribe and settled in Yathrib (Medina), which was then controlled by Jewish clans, and the Banu Qayla were subordinate to the Jews for some time, until Mālik bin Ajlān of Khazraj asserts independence of the Jews so Aws and Khazraj obtained a share of palm trees and strongholds. Thus, about the 5th century, the Banu Qayla took control of Yathrib, and Jews retired into the background for about a century.

During the period before the Hijra, Abu Qays al-Aslat of the clan of Wāʼil, the leader of Aws, gave away the leadership to Ḥuḍayr bin Simāk of ʻAbd al-Ashhal. After a serious defeat, ʻAbd al-Ashhal and Ẓafar were withdrawn from Yathrib. The opposing leader, ʻAmr bin Nuʻmān, of the Khazrajite clan of Bayāḍa, drove the Jewish tribes of Banu Qurayza and Banu Nadir into alliance of the two. Nomads of Muzayna joined them too. Most of the Khazraj except ʻAbd Allāh bin Ubayy and another Khazraj leader, as well as the Jewish tribe Banū Qaynuqāʻ and the nomadic Juhayna and Ashjaʻ, supported ‘Amr bin Nu‘mān. The Awsite clan of Ḥāritha remained neutral. Then, in about 617, the Battle of Buʻāth began: the Aws forced back at first but finally defeated their opponents. The leaders of both sides were killed.

Shi'a sources say they were Jews, But a Jewish source says that they and the Banu Khazraj were Arab tribes from Yemen who came to Medina in the fourth century. The Jewish source says that the two tribes took the power of Medina from the Jews in the 5th century by "calling in outside assistance and treacherously massacring at a banquet".

A Shi'a source says that they had been fighting for 120 years and were enemies. The Jewish source states that they went to war against each other in the Battle of Bu'ath a few years before the Islamic prophet Muhammad migrated to Medina.

There were many Jewish tribes in Medina: Banu Nadir, Banu Qurayza, Banu Qaynuqa and so many others. During the battle, the Banu Nadir and the Banu Qurayza fought with the Banu Aws, and the Banu Qaynuqa were allied with the Banu Khazraj. The latter were defeated after a long and desperate battle.

Hijrah
Muhammad came to Medina as a mediator, invited to resolve the feud between the Banu Aws and the Banu Khazraj. He ultimately did so by absorbing both factions into his Muslim community and forbidding bloodshed among Muslims.

The Banu Aws were included in the Constitution of Medina as allies to the Muslims, "one nation/community with the Believers". Then, Banu Aws and others became known as the Ansar.

Banu Qurayza
The Banu Qurayza were a Jewish tribe who lived in Medina. The tribe's men, apart from a few who converted to Islam, were sentenced to death in 627 in retaliation for Banu Qurayza treachery and subversion in aiding the Meccan pagan enemies who had launched a ferocious attack on Madinah, in order to eliminate the Muslims and their allies during the Battle of the Trench.

Since the Banu Qurayza had been an ally of the Banu Aus during the Battle of Bu'ath, they choose Sa'ad ibn Mua'dh, the chief of the Banu Aus as their judge. He condemned the men to death and the women and children to slavery. Sa'ad ibn Mua'dh himself died shortly after the event from injuries that he had received during the Battle of the Trench.

People
Sa'ad ibn Mua'dh - head
Bashir ibn Sa'ad leader
Usaid bin Hudair bin Sammak
Sa‘d bin Khaithamah bin Al-Harith
Rifa‘a bin ‘Abdul Mundhir bin Zubair

See also
Islam
List of expeditions of Muhammad

References

Sources
 
 
 
 
 
 

Tribes of Arabia
Tribes of Saudi Arabia
Azd
Converts to Islam